Back Street or Backstreet may refer to:

Places
 Back Street, Suffolk, a village in Suffolk, England

Books
 Back Street (novel), a 1931 romance novel written by Fannie Hurst
Backstreets Magazine, a quarterly Bruce Springsteen fanzine

Film and TV
 Back Street (1932 film), based on the novel
 Back Street (1941 film), based on the novel 
 Back Street (1961 film), based on the novel - starring Susan Hayward, John Gavin
 Backstreet (Transformers), a fictional character in the Transformers universe

Music
 Backstreet Boys, a pop music group
 Back Street (album) an album by jazz saxophonist Lou Donaldson
 Backstreet (album), a 1982 album by David Sanborn
 "Backstreets", a song by Bruce Springsteen from the 1977 album Born to Run
 "Back Street", a 1965 single by Edwin Starr